The 1915 Northwestern Purple team represented Northwestern University during the 1915 college football season. In their second year under head coach Fred J. Murphy, the Purple compiled a 2–5 record (0–5 against Western Conference opponents) and finished in last place in the Western Conference.

Schedule

References

Northwestern
Northwestern Wildcats football seasons
Northwestern Purple football